The AZAL 2011–12 season was AZAL's seventh Azerbaijan Premier League season. AZAL finished the season in 7th place and were knocked out of the 2011–12 Azerbaijan Cup by FK Baku in the Quarter-finals and by FC Minsk of Belarus in the 1st Qualifying Round of the 2011–12 UEFA Europa League.

Nazim Suleymanov resigned as manager of AZAL during preseason, being replaced by Elkhan Abdullayev, who himself resigned in October, being replaced by Rafig Mirzayev. Mirzayev was the manager for 6 months before having his contract terminated by mutual consent in April 2012. Mais Azimov was appointed as a caretaker manager for one game before Vagif Sadygov was appointed manager on 6 April 2012.
The team's kit was supplied by Umbro and their sponsor was Silk Way.

Squad

Transfers

Summer

In:

 

Out:

Winter

In:

Out:

}

Competitions

Azerbaijan Premier League

Results summary

Results by round

Results

Table

Azerbaijan Premier League Relegation Group

Results summary

Results by round

Results

Table

Azerbaijan Cup

Europa League

First qualifying round

Squad statistics

Appearances and goals

|-
|colspan="14"|Players who appeared for AZAL no longer at the club:

|}

Goal scorers

Disciplinary record

References 

AZAL
AZAL PFC seasons
AZAL